Euzophera tetragramma is a species of snout moth in the genus Euzophera. It was described by Rebel in 1910. It is found in Russia.

References

Moths described in 1910
Phycitini
Moths of Europe